Antonio Adamini (25 December 1792 in Bigogno, Ticino - 16 June 1846, St. Petersburg) was a Swiss-born Russian architect and engineer.

Of his training little is known, but he was appointed in the late spring of 1816 (some say 1818) with his cousin Domenico Adamini to the court of the Russian Tsar. After furthered his career in the administration and he was the architect of the State Bank in the 1830s. Adamini's significant structural performance was to construct the 25-meter-high monument to Tsar Alexander, a monolithic granite pillar, the Alexander Column in 1832 and 1834, before the Winter Palace with Auguste de Montferrand. The logistical preparation for this project took four years. Adamini also designed a monument to the Battle of Borodino on the road to Smolensk.

Literature
Isabelle Rucki und Dorothee Huber (Hg): Architektenlexikon der Schweiz - 19./20. Jahrhundert Basel: Birkhäuser 1998.

References

Swiss expatriates in Russia
1792 births
1846 deaths
Russian architects
Swiss engineers
Architects from Ticino